Stuart Irwin Henry (born 21 June 1946), is a former Australian politician, who was elected to the House of Representatives as member for the Division of Hasluck, Western Australia for the Liberal Party of Australia at the 2004 federal election. He was a small business proprietor and farm manager before entering politics. 
 
Henry is a member of the Australian Society of Association Executives and the Australian Institute of Company Directors, and was a director of Group Training Australia 2002–03, the West Australian Construction Industry Redundancy Fund 1999–2003 and the Australian Construction Industry Safety Training Trust. He was Deputy Chair of the Building and Construction Industry Training Council (BCITC) 2002–03.

Henry lost his seat to Labor candidate Sharryn Jackson at the 2007 general election.

References

1946 births
Living people
Liberal Party of Australia members of the Parliament of Australia
Members of the Australian House of Representatives for Hasluck
21st-century Australian politicians